Dipogon variegatus is a pompilid spider wasp in the subfamily Pepsinae from the Palearctic.

Identification
Like the other two British species of Dipogon this is an all black wasp with bifasciate forewings (two dark brown bands) with a white spot at the top. The females can be recognised by transverse wrinkles on the first abdominal segment, in males these are less prominent and the subgenital plate at the tip of the abdomen has long ventral hairs.

Distribution
This species can be found in most of Europe, in the eastern Palearctic realm, and in North Africa. In Britain it is mainly found in England and Wales with scattered records in the south of Scotland and the central Highlands but has not been recorded recently in Ireland.

Habitat
These wasps inhabit a wide variety of open habitats including gardens, parks, fields, meadows and coastal heaths.

Biology
Adults have a flight period from May to October. D.variegatus will utilise almost any kind of pre-existing cavity including dead plant stems,  dead wood, masonry cavities and even old snail shells. The nest cavity is plugged with sand grains, soil or plant debris which is bound together by spider silk collected by the female using the maxillar bristles which give the genus Dipogon its name.  In small cavities single cells may be constructed but if space permits multiple cells will be built. Each cell is provided with one spider, mainly belonging to the genera Clubiona, Thomisus and Xysticus.  In Britain it seems to exclusively prey on the crab spider Xysticus cristatus.

References

Hymenoptera of Europe
Pepsinae
Wasps described in 1758
Taxa named by Carl Linnaeus